Fred George "Mad Dog" Whittingham (February 4, 1939 – October 27, 2003) was an American football player and coach.  He played as a linebacker in the National Football League (NFL) for the Los Angeles Rams, Philadelphia Eagles, New Orleans Saints, and Dallas Cowboys. Whittingham played college football at Brigham Young University (BYU) and California Polytechnic State University. He coached in the NFL and at the college level from 1973 to 2000.

Early years
Whittingham was born in Boston, Massachusetts on February 4, 1939. He was placed in state foster care until he was adopted by the Whittinghams, who lived in Warwick, Rhode Island, when he was nine months old.  He attended Warwick Veterans Memorial High School where he played football, basketball, baseball, and track. He was an All-State selection in football] basketball, and track.

He had a troubled youth and missed half of his senior season, which scared schools away, even though he was considered one of the best athletes in the New England area.

Whittingham was voted as one of the 50 best athletes of the century in Rhode Island.

College career
Whittingham accepted a scholarship from Brigham Young University, after it was the only Division I school offer he received. He played defensive end for the football team.

He was a part of the Tom Lee boxing team, based on a recommendation he received to control his temper. He won the 1958 Intermountain Heavyweight Championship and the Regional Golden Gloves competition in Las Vegas, receiving offers to turn professional.

In 1959, he decided to transfer to Cal Poly San Luis Obispo, before facing the possibility of being expelled after incurring in violations to the school's conduct code.

On October 29, 1960, he was in a hospital with a concussion and didn't travel with his football team, making him one of the survivors of the crash of the Cal-Poly team plane in Toledo, Ohio, as the Mustangs were returning to California from a game against Bowling Green University. One of his surviving teammates was Ted Tollner, who would also later become a football coach in the NFL.

He was a three-year starter in football, playing tight end on offense and defensive end on defense, while earning Little All-American honors in 1961. In his senior season he played offensive guard, earning All-Coast honors. During his college career, he also competed in track and field, finishing third in the discus and the shot put events in the 1961 California Collegiate Athletic Association Championships.

In 2002, he was inducted into Cal Poly Athletics Hall of fame.

Professional career

Los Angeles Rams
Whittingham was signed as an undrafted free agent by the Los Angeles Rams after the 1963 NFL Draft. He injured his knee as a rookie and was placed on the injured reserve list. He played guard, before being waived on September 1, 1965.

Philadelphia Eagles (first stint)
In 1966, he was signed as a free agent by the Philadelphia Eagles and was converted into a linebacker.

New Orleans Saints
Whittingham was selected by the New Orleans Saints in the 1967 NFL Expansion Draft, becoming the franchise's first starting middle linebacker. In 1968, he was named the NFL defensive player of the week, after playing a key role in an upset against the Minnesota Vikings. On September 9, 1969, he was waived after having issues with owner John Mecom.

Dallas Cowboys
On September 20, 1969, he was signed to the Dallas Cowboys taxi squad. He was promoted to the active roster on November 7 and played mostly on special teams. On September 9, 1970, he was cut and signed to the taxi squad. He was released on September 14.

Boston Patriots
In 1970, Whittingham was signed as a free agent by the Boston Patriots. He played mostly on special teams.

Philadelphia Eagles (second stint)
On November 5, 1971, Whittingham was signed by the Philadelphia Eagles to replace an injured Bill Hobbs. He was waived injured in December.

Coaching career
Throughout Whittingham's coaching career he held various assistant coaching positions in both the NFL and the college football ranks. After retiring from the NFL he began coaching at the high school level. In 1972, as the first-year head coach of the Alhambra (CA) Moors, Whittingham led the team to an 8-1 record and into a pre-CIF playoff game. 

Whittingham returned to Brigham Young University, in 1973 to coach under Lavell Edwards. He coached the linebackers and later became the defensive coordinator. After his time at BYU he left to coach in the NFL where he spent nine years with the Los Angeles Rams. He returned to college football in 1992 to be the defensive coordinator at Utah. While he was the defensive coordinator for Utah he hired his son, Kyle Whittingham, to coach the linebackers. After three years at Utah he left again to coach in the NFL and his son Kyle replaced him as defensive coordinator. 

After spending three years with the Oakland Raiders he returned to Utah to coach under his son Kyle as the linebackers coach. He continued in that position until 2001 when he was fired by coach Ron McBride, at which time he encouraged his son to stay on as the defensive coordinator. Whittingham retired from coaching after leaving Utah.

Family and death
While at BYU, Whittingham met and married Nancy Livingston, a cheerleader and BYU student from California. Together they have four sons and two daughters. Later in life Whittingham converted to the Church of Jesus Christ of Latter-day Saints, the same church that his wife was a member of and the same church that runs BYU.

His oldest son Kyle Whittingham played in the NFL and became the football head coach for the University of Utah. Fred's second son, Cary, also played in the NFL, notably on the Los Angeles Rams with his brother Kyle as a teammate and Fred as his coach.

Whittingham died on October 27, 2003, in a hospital in Provo, Utah of complications from back surgery.

References

External links
 Cal Poly Hall of Fame profile
 

1939 births
2003 deaths
American football linebackers
American football offensive guards
Boston Patriots players
BYU Cougars football coaches
BYU Cougars football players
Dallas Cowboys players
Cal Poly Mustangs football players
Los Angeles Rams players
Los Angeles Rams scouts
New Orleans Saints players
Philadelphia Eagles players
Utah Utes football coaches
Sportspeople from Boston
Sportspeople from Warwick, Rhode Island
Players of American football from Rhode Island
Players of American football from Boston
American Latter Day Saints
Converts to Mormonism